Ralph Starr (6 March 1903 – 20 November 1959) was a British middle-distance runner. He competed in the men's 800 metres at the 1928 Summer Olympics.

References

External links
 

1903 births
1959 deaths
Athletes (track and field) at the 1924 Summer Olympics
Athletes (track and field) at the 1928 Summer Olympics
British male middle-distance runners
Olympic athletes of Great Britain
Place of birth missing